1-Butyl-3-methylimidazolium hexafluorophosphate, also known as BMIM-PF6, is a viscous, colourless, hydrophobic and non-water-soluble ionic liquid with a melting point of -8 °C. Together with 1-butyl-3-methylimidazolium tetrafluoroborate, BMIM-BF4, it is one of the most widely studied ionic liquids. It is known to very slowly decompose in the presence of water.

Preparation
BMIM-PF6 is commercially available. It may be obtained in two steps: BMIM-Cl is synthesized by alkylating 1-methylimidazole with 1-chlorobutane. A metathesis reaction with potassium hexafluorophosphate gives the desired compound; the tetrafluoroborate may be prepared by analogously using potassium tetrafluoroborate.

See also
 1-Butyl-3-methylimidazolium tetrachloroferrate

References

Further reading

Hexafluorophosphates
Imidazolium compounds
Ionic liquids